Xenia Boodberg Lee (November 28, 1927 – September 27, 2004) was an American concert pianist, based in the San Francisco Bay Area.

Early life
Xenia Boodberg was born in Oakland, California, the only child of Peter A. Boodberg (1903-1972) and Elena (Helen) Boodberg (1896-1980). Her father was a Russian-born Baltic German linguistics scholar and professor of Oriental Languages at the University of California in Berkeley. Her aunt Valentina A. Vernon recalled that her parents tried to raise her without speaking English as a small child, "only French and Russian".

Xenia Boodberg was a creative child, publishing poems and stories in the Berkeley newspaper at age 8, and winning an essay contest on fire prevention from the Berkeley Lodge of Elks, also in 1936. She was performing at public events as a pianist before and into her early teens. She earned an associate in arts degree at the University of California in 1948. She also studied with pianist Egon Petri at Mills College, and with pianist Adolph Baller.

Career
Soon after college, in January 1949, she gave a program of piano music by composers Darius Milhaud, Roger Sessions, Joaquín Nin-Culmell, Béla Bartók, and Claude Debussy in New York, of which The New York Times reviewer commented, "Miss Boodberg remains a pianist of unusual potentialities, especially in the field of new music". She played recitals and concerts, especially twentieth-century works, in the San Francisco Bay area and elsewhere, often and for many years afterwards, into the 1970s. She was a member of the San Francisco Musical Club and played with the Oakland Symphony and the Stockton Symphony.

Personal life
Before February 1950, Xenia Boodberg married Richard Henry Lee, a marine sargeant and Korean War veteran, and a descendant of American founding father Richard Henry Lee. They had two children, Richard and Julie. She died in 2004, aged 76 years.

References

1927 births
2004 deaths
American classical pianists
Musicians from Oakland, California
University of California alumni
20th-century American pianists
20th-century classical pianists
20th-century American women pianists
American people of Baltic German descent
American women classical pianists
Classical musicians from California
21st-century American women